Neosphaeniscus is a genus of tephritid  or fruit flies in the family Tephritidae.

Species
Neosphaeniscus flexuosus (Bigot, 1857)
Neosphaeniscus m-nigrum (Hendel, 1914)

References

Tephritinae
Tephritidae genera
Diptera of South America